Ulhasnagar taluka is a taluka in Thane district of Maharashtra in Konkan division.

Thane district
Until 31 July 2014, Thane was the country's most populous district with a population of over 1.2 crore. On 1 August 2014,  the talukas of Mokhada, Jawahar, Talasari, Vikramgadh, Wada, Dahanu, Palghar and Vasai were separated from the erstwhile Thane district to form a new district Palghar. The talukas  Thane, Bhiwandi, Kalyan, Ulhasnagar, Ambernath, Murbad and Shahapur were retained in Thane district.

References

Talukas in Thane district
Talukas in Maharashtra